California's 5th congressional district is a U.S. congressional district in California.

The district is located in the northern San Joaquin Valley and central Sierra Nevada. The district includes all of Amador, Calaveras, Tuolumne and Mariposa counties, western El Dorado County, and eastern Stanislaus, Madera and Fresno counties. Cities in the district include most of Modesto, northern Turlock, northern Fresno, Oakdale, Hughson, Riverbank, Sonora, Jackson, and Placerville. It also includes the census-designated places of Mariposa, the County seat of Mariposa County, and El Dorado Hills.  It also includes Yosemite National Park and part of Kings Canyon National Park. It is represented by Republican Tom McClintock.

From 2013 to 2022, the district was located in the northern part of the San Francisco Bay Area, including Santa Rosa, Vallejo, and most of Wine Country. The district was represented by Mike Thompson, a Democrat.

Election results from recent statewide races

List of members representing the district

Complete election results

1884

1886

1888

1890

1892

1894

1896

1898

1900

1902

1904

1906

1908

1910

1912

1914

1916

1918

1920

1922

1923 (Special)
Republican Mae Nolan won the special election to replace her husband John I. Nolan, who won re-election but died before the 68th Congress convened. Data for this special election is not available.

1924

1926 (Special)
Republican Richard J. Welch won the special election to replace fellow Republican Lawrence J. Flaherty, who died in office. Data for this special election is not available.

1926

1928

1930

1932

1934

1936

1938

1940

1942

1944

1946

1948

1949 (Special)
Democrat John F. Shelley won the special election to replace Republican Richard J. Welch, who died in office. Data for this special election is not available.

1950

1952

1954

1956

1958

1960

1962

1964

1966

1968

1970

1972

1974

1976

1978

1980

1982

1983 (Special)

1984

1986

1987 (Special)

1988

1990

1992

1994

1996

1998

2000

2002

2004

2005 (special)
Incumbent Robert Matsui died January 1, 2005. In a special election held on March 8, 2005 to fill the vacancy, Matsui's widow, Doris, won the seat with almost 68% of the vote. She was sworn in on March 10, 2005.

2006

2008

2010

2012

2014

2016

2018

2020

2022

Timeline of representatives 
The following timeline depicts the progression of the representatives and their political affiliation at the time of assuming office.

See also
List of United States congressional districts

References

External links
GovTrack.us: California's 5th congressional district
RAND California Election Returns: District Definitions (out of date)
California Voter Foundation map - CD05 (out of date)
Interview of Paul Smith, Republican candidate for the 5th CD recorded July 15, 2008 in Sacramento, CA

05
Government of Contra Costa County, California
Government of Lake County, California
Government of Napa County, California
Government of Solano County, California
Government of Sonoma County, California
Benicia, California
Hercules, California
Lakeport, California
Martinez, California
Napa, California
Santa Rosa, California
Sonoma, California
Vallejo, California
Yountville, California
Constituencies established in 1885
1885 establishments in California